The 1976 United States Senate election in Hawaii took place on November 2, 1976. Incumbent Republican U.S. Senator Hiram Fong did not seek re-election to a fourth term. Democrat Spark Matsunaga won the open seat by defeating Republican William Quinn.

Primary elections were held on October 2. Former Governor William F. Quinn easily won the Republican nomination with 93 percent of the vote. In the Democratic primary, Spark Matsunaga won with 51 percent of the vote. His closest competitor was his House colleague Patsy Mink, who received 41 percent.

Democratic primary

Candidates
Spark Matsunaga, U.S. Representative
Patsy Mink, U.S. Representative from Honolulu

General election

Candidates
Anthony Hodges (People's)
Rockne Hart Johnson (Libertarian)
James Kimmel (Independent)
Spark Matsunaga, U.S. Congressman (Democratic)
William Quinn, former Governor of Hawaii (Republican)

Results

See also 
 1976 United States Senate elections

References

External links

Hawaii
1976
1976 Hawaii elections